John 20:19 is the nineteenth verse of the twentieth chapter of the Gospel of John in the New Testament. It describes what it says is the first appearance of Jesus to his disciples after Resurrection of Jesus, and in a locked room of a house.

Content
The original Koine Greek, according to the Textus Receptus, reads:

In the King James Version of the Bible it is translated as:
Then the same day at evening, being the first day of the week, when the doors were shut where the disciples were assembled for fear of the Jews, came Jesus and stood in the midst, and saith unto them, Peace be unto you.

The modern World English Bible translates the passage as:
When therefore it was evening, on that day, the first day of the week, and when the doors were locked where the disciples were assembled, for fear of the Jews, Jesus came and stood in the midst, and said to them, "Peace be to you."

For a collection of other versions see BibleHub John 20:19

Analysis
The account of Jesus' first appearance in the Gospel of John (20:19–23) shows similarity to the account in the Gospel of Luke (Luke 24:36), that it happened in Jerusalem in the evening of his resurrection from the dead.

Only John mentions that the door was locked, and its "reason" (fear of the Jews to persecute them after their leader was executed), but the "function" is to show the 'miraculous nature of Jesus' appearance', that the risen Jesus is 'no longer bound by normal space conditions'. The door was not merely shut but locked (Greek perfect verb:).

The words Peace be with you is a common traditional Jewish greeting (shalom alekem, or  shalom lekom; cf. ) still in use today; repeated in John 20:21 & 26), but here Jesus conveys the peace he previously promised to his disciples, causing the rapid switch of their emotion from "fear" (verse 19) to "joy" (verse 20).

The number of the disciples present is not certain, although Thomas' absence is singled out in verse 24, and Judas Iscariot left, but some other disciples less tightly connected could be present as well.

References

Sources

External links
Jesus Appears to His Disciples

20:19
John 20:19